The 1990 Danish 1st Division season was the 45th season of the Danish 1st Division, and the last in which it was the country's top flight. At the end of the season the new Danish Superliga was formed as the country's new top division.

The champions qualified for the 1991–92 European Cup qualification, while the second and third placed teams qualified for the qualification round of the 1991–92 UEFA Cup. The four lowest placed teams of the tournament was directly relegated to the (now second-tier) Danish 1st Division, while the teams placed ninth and tenth played qualification games against the champions and runners-up in the 2nd Division.

Table

Results

Top goalscorers

External links
  Peders Fodboldstatistik

Danish 1st Division seasons
Dan
Dan
1
Top level Danish football league seasons